Behram Abduweli (born 8 March 2003) is a Chinese footballer of Uyghur ethnic, currently playing as a forward for Shandong Taishan.

Club career
Born in Yili, Xinjiang, Abduweli started his career with the Inner Mongolia Shengle Mengyang team in 2015. In October 2021, he moved to Chinese Super League side Shandong Taishan. He would be given an opportunity to participate within senior games when he was part of the AFC Champions League squad, which was a mix of reserves and youth players to participate within centralized venues while the clubs senior players were still dealing with self-isolating measures due to COVID-19. This would see him make his debut in a AFC Champions League continental game on 15 April 2022 against Daegu FC in a 7-0 defeat.

Midway through the 2022 season, he was sent on loan to China League Two side Jinan Xingzhou.

International career
Iminqari has represented China from under-18 to under-20 level.

He scored three goals in his first two appearances for the under-20 side, before being called up to the squad for the 2023 AFC U-20 Asian Cup.

Career statistics
.

References

External links

2003 births
Living people
Footballers from Xinjiang
Uyghur sportspeople
Chinese footballers
Association football forwards
China League Two players
Shandong Taishan F.C. players
21st-century Chinese people